Patrick Spencer is an Antiguan former cyclist. He competed in the sprint event at the 1976 Summer Olympics.

References

External links
 

Year of birth missing (living people)
Living people
Antigua and Barbuda male cyclists
Olympic cyclists of Antigua and Barbuda
Cyclists at the 1976 Summer Olympics
Place of birth missing (living people)